Ugia minima is a species of moth in the family Erebidae. It is found in Cameroon.

References

Moths described in 1940
Ugia
Moths of Africa